Bujela is an administrative ward in the Rungwe district of the Mbeya Region of Tanzania.

In 2016 the Tanzania National Bureau of Statistics report there were 6,149 people in the ward, from 5,579 in 2012, from 6,090 in 2002. The ward has .

Villages and hamlets 
The ward has 5 villages, and 16 hamlets.

 Mpombo
 Mpombo
 Salima
 Kyambambembe
 Makina
 Makuyu
 Nsongola
 Kilange
 Lupila
 Nkuyu
 Nsongola
 Bujela
 Bujege
 Bujela
 Busyala
 Ntuso
 Segela
 Brazil
 Ipyana
 Segela
 katonya

References 

Wards of Mbeya Region